Circuit de Lédenon is a  motor racing circuit located next to the town of Lédenon, Gard, France, about  northeast of Nîmes. It hosts FFSA GT Championship and French F4 Championship.

History
In 1970, two motor sport enthusiasts, Jean-Claude and Sylvie Bondurand, decided to build a circuit in the town of Lédenon. The circuit was approved for use on June 16, 1973. The first notable races at the circuit were not held until 1977, when Super Touring and Formula Renault events were held. The track has been in use continuously since then, hosting a variety of series, from touring cars and French GT to the French F4 Championship.

The circuit is set in a natural bowl giving it a high amount of altitude change and making it the most undulating track in France. This, coupled with its winding layout, makes it a difficult circuit to drive. It is also the only major race track in France to run in an anti-clockwise direction.

Lap records 

The official race lap records at the Circuit de Lédenon are listed as:

Notes

References

External links

Motorsport venues in France
Sports venues in Gard